Destruction Force (originally titled La banda del trucido (The Numbskull's Gang), also known as Dirty Gang) is a 1977 Italian poliziottesco directed by Stelvio Massi. It is the fourth entry into the Tanzi/Moretto/Monnezza shared universe and second film in which Tomas Milian plays the character of Monnezza serving as a direct sequel to Free Hand for a Tough Cop (Il trucido e lo sbirro).

The participation of Milian was due to an old contract he was forced to fulfill; originally intended as a special appearance, the role of Milian was expanded to make it appear as the star of the film, and Milian obtained in exchange to construct his character as he wanted and to write (uncredited) his dialogue lines. The film was shot in three weeks, but Milian filmed his part in just five days.

Cast 
Luc Merenda: Commissioner Ghini
Tomas Milian: Sergio Marazzi, aka "Er Monnezza"
Massimo Vanni: Marchetti
Elio Zamuto: Belli
Franco Citti: Lanza
Mario Brega:Quaestor Alberti 
Imma Piro: Agnese Rinaldi

References

Works cited

External links

1977 films
Poliziotteschi films
Italian crime comedy films
1970s crime comedy films
1977 comedy films
1970s Italian films
Films directed by Stelvio Massi